The Fort São Francisco of Macau (Fortaleza de São Francisco de Macau in Portuguese) also known as the São Francisco Barracks (Quartel de São Francisco in Portuguese) is a former fort of the Portuguese Empire built in Macau, China.

It was erected southeast of Praia Grande, in front of Taipa channel. The fort was originally a artillery battery, the fire of which sank the Dutch warship Gallias during the Battle of Macau. It was expanded in 1629 and turned into a proper fort. It had an oval shape and its walls measured six meters high.The fort was incorporated into the Monastery of Saint Francis, built by Spanish missionaries in 1580 but it closed in 1834 and was demolished in 1861. Five years later the São Francisco Barracks were installed in the fort, to house the 4th Line Battalion, transferred to Macau in 1864. On the cape just below the barracks the Battery 1º de Dezembro was built, in 1872 but it was demolished when the Outer Harbour was filled, in 1934. It's artillery included a culverin that could fire a 17kg cannoball across the channel. 

It's installations currently house the Macau Security Forces Management Bureau and Museum, established in 1991 to take over the functions from the former Public Security Forces Headquarters. Within, a collection of old guns and armoured cars can be found, as well as paintings of the old fort and monastery, and other military artefacts.

See also
Portuguese Macau

References

Forts in Macau
Portuguese forts
Historic Centre of Macau
Landmarks in Macau
Portuguese Macau
1629 establishments in China
1629 establishments in the Portuguese Empire
17th-century establishments in Macau
Portuguese colonial architecture in China